Wu Qunli (born March 20, 1960, in Guangzhou) is a Chinese football coach and former international midfield player. As a player he represented Guangzhou FC and Hong Kong First Division League side South China, while internationally he also played for his country in the 1988 Summer Olympics and 1992 AFC Asian Cup. Since retiring he would move into management where he returned to Guangzhou FC as an assistant before becoming their manager for a short spell.

Playing career
Wu Qunli was born in the Baiyun District within Guangzhou and would join second-tier football club Guangzhou FC within the 1983 league season. He would soon see his club win promotion to the top tier at the end of the 1984 league season, via the Chinese FA Cup. The following season would see him called up to the Chinese national team for the first time where he would become a regular before playing with the senior team in the 1988 Summer Olympics. By the 1990 league season Guangzhou FC were in the second tier, however Wu made sure this was short lived and aided the club to a runners-up position and promotion back up to the top tier, this wouldn't go unnoticed and he personally won the Chinese footballer of the year award. By now Wu had become a vital member for his club and country and go on to lead China into the 1992 AFC Asian Cup where they came third.

With another Chinese footballer of the year award won at the end of the 1993 league season Wu would leave Guangzhou FC and  join Hong Kong First Division League side South China in 1994. He would immediately make an impression within the team when he won the Hong Kong Viceroy Cup at the end of the 1993–94 league season. He would then be given the nickname of "Golden Left Foot" for he saved the team many times by scoring some great goals using his left foot. A Hong Kong Senior Shield and Hong Kong FA Cup at the end of the 1995-96 league season followed despite Wu missing six months after an injury sustained on March 9, 1996. With Wu winning the Hong Kong First Division League title at the end of the 1996–97 league season Wu would soon move to Golden and then Tung Po before he retired.

Honours

Player

Club
South China AA
Hong Kong First Division League: 1996–97
Hong Kong Senior Shield: 1995–96, 1996–97
Hong Kong Viceroy Cup: 1993–94, 1997–98
Hong Kong FA Cup: 1995–96

International
AFC Asian Cup: 1992 (Third)

Individual
CFA Footballer of the Year: 1990, 1993

References

External links
 HKFA.com 南華92/93邀請隊 - 眾星回顧(二) (in Chinese)
 

1960 births
Living people
Chinese footballers
Footballers from Guangzhou
China international footballers
Chinese football managers
Hong Kong First Division League players
South China AA players
Guangzhou F.C. players
sun Hei SC players
Footballers at the 1988 Summer Olympics
1988 AFC Asian Cup players
1992 AFC Asian Cup players
Olympic footballers of China
Guangzhou F.C. managers
Hunan Billows F.C. managers
Footballers at the 1990 Asian Games
Association football midfielders
Association football forwards
Asian Games competitors for China